William John Knotwell III (born January 24, 1978) is an American politician. He was a Republican member of the Utah House of Representatives representing District 52 from January 1, 2013 to October 26, 2019. The district includes Herriman, western Riverton, southwest South Jordan in the State of Utah.

Born to American parents in Subic Bay, Republic of the Philippines, Knotwell spent most of his childhood in Southern California, near San Diego. Knotwell's father was a career United States Navy sailor who spent half his career as an enlisted sailor and half as a Commissioned Warrant Officer.

Early life and education
Knotwell graduated from Poway High School in Poway, California. He attended California State University, Northridge for one year. In December 1997, Knotwell moved to Utah and enrolled as a summer visiting student at Brigham Young University. He was unsuccessful in his attempts to be accepted full-time and later enrolled at Utah Valley State College.

Knotwell earned his Associate of Science in political science from Utah Valley State College (now Utah Valley University), a Bachelor of Science in political science with a minor in history from the University of Utah, and a Masters in Business Administration from Utah State University.

Career 
During the 2010 Utah Republican neighborhood caucus, Knotwell was elected to serve as precinct chair, county delegate, and state delegate. He participated in the state and county party conventions and served his term until 2012. In 2011, Knotwell ran for the Herriman City Council to represent District 1. He was unsuccessful in unseating incumbent city councilman Matt Robinson.

In March 2012, Knotwell announced his intention to seek the Republican nomination for Utah House of Representatives. Following the 2010 United States census, the seat was occupied by Daniel McCay was redistricted and became an open seat. Four candidates sought the nomination and Knotwell won on the first ballot with 76% of the vote. In the November 2012 general election he won the popular vote and was designated representative-elect until taking office on January 1, 2013.

Utah State House of Representatives

60th Utah State Legislature (2013–2014) 
 Committee Assignments
 Infrastructure and General Government Appropriations Committee, Member
 House Revenue & Taxation Standing Committee, Member
 House Transportation Committee, Member
 Public Utilities & Technology Interim Committee, Member

61st Utah State Legislature (2015–2016) 
 Committee Assignments
 House Business & Labor Standing Committee, Vice Chair
 House Rules Committee, Vice Chair
 Infrastructure and General Government Appropriations Committee, Member
 House Revenue & Taxation Standing Committee, Member
 IT Steering Committee, Member

62nd Utah State Legislature (2017–2018) 
Representative Knotwell was elected to serve as the majority assistant whip during the 62nd Utah State Legislature. In this capacity, he assists other members of the majority elected leadership to craft the state budget, negotiate priorities among the Utah Senate and governor's office and secure votes among the Utah House of Representatives.
 Committee Assignments
 Executive Appropriations, Member
 House Business & Labor Standing Committee, Member
 House Transportation Standing Committee, Member
 IT Steering Committee, Member

Personal life 
Knotwell lives in Herriman, Utah and works as senior vice president of global sales at Nuvi. Knotwell and his wife, Jill, have five children.

Electoral history

2012 election

2014 election

2016 election

References

External links
Official page at the Utah State Legislature
Campaign site
John Knotwell at Ballotpedia
John Knotwell at OpenSecrets

Place of birth missing (living people)
Living people
Republican Party members of the Utah House of Representatives
People from Herriman, Utah
University of Utah alumni
Utah Valley University alumni
21st-century American politicians
1978 births